Moses James Tyson Jr. (born May 21, 1961) is an American gospel musician and organist. He started his music career, in 1973, with learning how to play the guitar by ear to be used on a Sly Stone album, who is his cousin. His first album, I Made up My Mind, came out in 1992 with Curb Records, yet this did not chart. The second album, Music, released in 1999 by Alpine Records, and this placed on two Billboard magazine charts. His next album to chart, Music Remastered & Sacred Organ Music, was released in 2010 with World Class Gospel Records, and this charted upon the Billboard magazine Gospel Albums chart. He would go on tours playing the guitar and organ for the likes of Billy Preston, Timothy Wright.

Early life
Tyson was born on May 21, 1961, in Vallejo, California, as Moses James Tyson Jr., the son of Reverend Moses Tyson Sr. and his mother, who was a pianist at his church. This gave Tyson the impetus to learn how to play the organ and become an organist during his late childhood and early teenage years. He would learn how to play the guitar at the urging of his cousin Sly Stone, so that he could be used on his albums, at the age of 12.

Music career
His music recording career began in 1992, with the release of I Made up My Mind by Curb Records, yet this failed to chart. His next album, Music, would be released by Alpine Records on November 30, 1999, and this placed upon two Billboard magazine Gospel Albums at No. 12 and No. 42 on the Independent Albums. The following album to chart, Music Remastered & Sacred Organ Music, was released by World Class Gospel Records in 2010, and it charted on the Gospel Albums at No. 28. Tyson went on tours with the likes of Billy Preston and Timothy Wright during the 1980s and early-1990s.

Personal life
Tyson resides in Vallejo, California.

Discography

References

1961 births
Living people
African-American songwriters
African-American Christians
American organists
American male organists
Musicians from Memphis, Tennessee
Musicians from Vallejo, California
Songwriters from California
Songwriters from Tennessee
21st-century organists
21st-century American male musicians
21st-century American keyboardists
21st-century African-American musicians
20th-century African-American people
American male songwriters